= Water supply and sanitation in Angola =

Water supply and sanitation is an ongoing challenge in the nation of Angola.

== Background ==
Angola has historically had issues with corruption and instability hindering its water infrastructure development.

== Recent developments ==
Despite being a relatively poor country, water access has improved in recent history. The percentage of Angolans with access to a stable water supply grew from 42% in 1990 to 54% in 2012.
